The women's 100 metres at the 2017 Asian Athletics Championships was held on 6 and 7 July.

Medalists

Results

Heats
Qualification rule: The first 3 in each heat (Q) and the next 4 fastest (q) qualified for the semifinals.

Wind:Heat 1: -0.1 m/s, Heat 2: 0.0 m/s, Heat 3: -0.2 m/s, Heat 4: +0.3 m/s

Semifinals
Qualification rule: First 3 in each semifinal (Q) and the next 2 fastest (q) qualified for the final.

Wind:Heat 1: -0.3 m/s, Heat 2: +0.2 m/s

Final
Wind: +1.0 m/s

References

100
100 metres at the Asian Athletics Championships